The Rongxian Giant Buddha (Chinese: 荣县; pinyin: Róngxìan) formerly romanized as Yong-hien or Hong-yien, is a  tall stone statue, built around 817 (during the Tang Dynasty), depicting Maitreya. It is 90 kilometres east of the Leshan Giant Buddha. The Buddha is carved out of the cliff face of a stone hill that lies to the north east of Rongxian and the Rongxi River in the eastern part of Sichuan province in China. Standing 414 metres above sea level, the stone sculpture overlooks the town of Rongxian below its feet. After the Leshan Giant Buddha, it is the second tallest pre-modern statue. The Temple is located on the Dafo Road, Rongxian, Zigong Shi, Sichuan Sheng, China. Dàfó (大佛) in Chinese means Big Buddha. The nearest city is Zigong.

History

Construction was started in around 817, by Chinese monks.

A sophisticated drainage system was incorporated into the Rongxian Giant Buddha when it was built, still in working order; it includes drainage pipes carved into various places on the body, to carry away the water after the rains so as to reduce weathering.

When the Giant Buddha was carved, a huge ten story wood structure, with five roofs was built to shelter it from the rain and sun. Unusually this structure is still in place.

The statue had been known about by westerners from as far back as the late 1870s when Edward Colborne Baber (a British traveller visiting Jah-ding and Mount Omei (Leshan)) had been told of its existence by an unknown Russian traveller. However it was not until 1910 that Roger Sprague (an American University Graduate) visited it. He found the figure to be on the same plan as the Buddha at Leshan. The upper half of the hill was sandstone cliff into which a niche 50 feet broad had been cut, "leaving a central core of stone carved into a figure seated in European style, not cross legged as Buddha is so often represented. There he sits, grimly gazing out at the tiled roof of the city which lies before him".
Sprague was also to see a Temple in Yong-hien, the city below the Great Buddha, where he noticed two chimneys which disproved the theory that "in China proper chimneys are unknown".

Degradation
The Rongxian Buddha has been affected by the pollution emanating from the unbridled development in the region. According to Xinhua news agency, the Leshan Giant Buddha and many Chinese natural and cultural heritage sites in the region have seen degradations from weathering, air pollution, and swarms of tourists. The government has promised restoration work.

Dimensions
His body is 36.67 metres high, the head 8.76 metres, and his shoulders are 12.67 metres wide The knees 12 metres high, and the feet 3.5 metres wide.

There is a local saying: "The mountain is a Buddha and the Buddha is a mountain".

The Temple covers an area of about 80,000 square metres, the temple and housing enclosing the Buddha is an area of 2000 square metres.

Gallery

See also

Buddhist art
Chinese Buddhism
List of tallest statues
Tang Dynasty
List of colossal sculpture in situ

References

External links

Most Remarkable Monument in Western China
Tour the whole of China - Rongxian Buddha
Visiting The Giant Buddhas

Outdoor sculptures in China
Colossal Buddha statues
Mountain monuments and memorials
Rock art in China
Major National Historical and Cultural Sites in Sichuan
Tang dynasty art
8th-century establishments in China
Rong County, Sichuan